Revenge of the Barbarians is a 1960 film about the sack of Rome in AD 410 by the Visigoths.

This film was written by Gastone Ramazzotti and directed by Giuseppe Vari.

Cast

Production
Anthony Steel had moved to Rome following his divorce from Anita Ekberg and this was the first of several movies he made in that country.

See also
List of historical drama films

References

External links

1960 films
Films set in ancient Rome
Films set in the 5th century
Films directed by Giuseppe Vari
1960s Italian-language films
English-language Italian films
1960s English-language films
1960s multilingual films
Italian multilingual films
1960s Italian films